Raffles is a 1930 American pre-Code comedy-mystery film produced by Samuel Goldwyn. It stars Ronald Colman as the title character, a proper English gentleman who moonlights as a notorious jewel thief, and Kay Francis as his love interest. It is based on the play Raffles, the Amateur Cracksman (1906) by E. W. Hornung and Eugene Wiley Presbrey, which was in turn adapted from the 1899 short story collection of the same name by Hornung.

Oscar Lagerstrom was nominated for an Academy Award for Best Sound Recording.

The story had been filmed previously as Raffles, the Amateur Cracksman (1917) with John Barrymore as Raffles, and again as Raffles, the Amateur Cracksman (1925) by Universal Studios. A 1939 film version titled Raffles, also produced by Goldwyn, stars David Niven in the title role.

Plot
Gentleman jewel thief A.J. Raffles (Ronald Colman) decides to give up his criminal ways as the notorious "Amateur Cracksman" after falling in love with Lady Gwen (Kay Francis). However, when his friend Bunny Manders (Bramwell Fletcher) tries to commit suicide because of a gambling debt he cannot repay, Raffles decides to take on one more job for Bunny's sake. He joins Bunny and Gwen as guests of Lord and Lady Melrose, with an eye toward acquiring the Melrose necklace, once the property of Empress Joséphine.

Complications arise when a gang of thieves also decides to try for the necklace at the same time. Inspector Mackenzie of Scotland Yard (David Torrence) gets wind of their plot and shows up at the Melrose estate with his men. Burglar Crawshaw breaks into the house and succeeds in stealing the jewelry, only to have Raffles take it away from him. Crawshaw is caught by the police, but learns his robber's identity.

Meanwhile, both Gwen and Mackenzie suspect that Raffles is the famous jewel thief. When the necklace is not found, Mackenzie insists that all the guests remain inside, then quickly changes his mind. Gwen overhears Mackenzie tell one of his men that he intends to let Crawshaw escape, expecting the crook to go after Raffles and thereby incriminate him. She follows Raffles back to London to warn him.

Crawshaw does as Mackenzie anticipated. However, Raffles convinces Crawshaw that it is too dangerous to pursue his original goal with all the policemen around and helps him escape. Then, Raffles publicly confesses to being the Amateur Cracksman. When Lord Melrose shows up, Raffles reminds him of the reward he offered for the necklace's return (conveniently the same amount that Bunny owes) and produces the jewelry. Then, he outwits Mackenzie and escapes, after arranging with Gwen to meet her in Paris.

Cast

 Ronald Colman as A.J. Raffles
 Kay Francis as Lady Gwen
 Bramwell Fletcher as Bunny
 Frances Dade as Ethel Crowley
 David Torrence as Inspector McKenzie
 Alison Skipworth as Lady Kitty Melrose
 Frederick Kerr as Lord Harry Melrose
 John Rogers as Crawshaw
 Wilson Benge as Barraclough

Production
According to Robert Osborne, host on Turner Classic Movies, Raffles was the last film that Samuel Goldwyn made in both a silent and talking version.

Cultural References

The film is mentioned in an episode of Dad's Army, 'No Spring for Frazer', when several of the characters are breaking into a house.

References

External links
 

1930 films
1930 comedy films
1930s comedy mystery films
1930s crime comedy films
1930s heist films
American black-and-white films
American comedy mystery films
American crime comedy films
American romantic comedy films
American films based on plays
American heist films
Films based on adaptations
Films directed by George Fitzmaurice
Films set in London
Films set in country houses
Samuel Goldwyn Productions films
Transitional sound films
Works based on A. J. Raffles
1930s English-language films
1930s American films